Polyethylene or polythene film biodegrades naturally, albeit over a long period of time.  Methods are available to make it more degradable under certain conditions of sunlight, moisture, oxygen, and composting and enhancement of biodegradation by reducing the hydrophobic polymer and increasing hydrophilic properties.

If traditional polyethylene film is littered it can be unsightly, and a hazard to wildlife.   Some people believe that making plastic shopping bags biodegradable is one way to try to allow the open litter to degrade.

Plastic recycling improves usage of resources. Biodegradable films need to be kept away from the usual recycling stream to prevent contaminating the polymers to be recycled.

If disposed of in a sanitary landfill, most traditional plastics do not readily decompose. The sterile conditions of a sealed landfill also deter degradation of biodegradable polymers.

Polyethylene is a polymer consisting of long chains of the monomer ethylene (IUPAC name ethene). The recommended scientific name polyethene is systematically derived from the scientific name of the monomer.[1] [2] In certain circumstances it is useful to use a structure–based nomenclature. In such cases IUPAC recommends poly(methylene).[2] The difference is due to the opening up of the monomer's double bond upon polymerisation.

In the polymer industry the name is sometimes shortened to PE in a manner similar to that by which other polymers like polypropylene and polystyrene are shortened to PP and PS respectively. In the United Kingdom the polymer is commonly called polythene, although this is not recognised scientifically.

The ethene molecule (known almost universally by its common name ethylene) C2H4 is CH2=CH2, Two CH2 groups connected by a double bond, thus:
       
Polyethylene is created through polymerization of ethene. It can be produced through radical polymerization, anionic addition polymerization, ion coordination polymerization or cationic addition polymerization. This is because ethene does not have any substituent groups that influence the stability of the propagation head of the polymer. Each of these methods results in a different type of polyethylene.

Alternatives to biodegradable polythene film 

Polythene or polyethylene film will naturally fragment and biodegrade, but it can take many decades to do this.  There are two methods to resolve this problem.  One is to modify the carbon chain of polyethylene with an additive to improve its degradability and then its biodegradability; the other is to make a film with similar properties to polyethylene from a biodegradable substance such as starch.  The latter are however much more expensive.

Starch based or biobased (hydrodegradable) film 
This type is made from corn (maize), potatoes or wheat. This form of biodegradable film meets the ASTM standard (American Standard for Testing Materials) and European Norm EN13432 for compostability as it degrades at least 90% within 90 days or less at 140 degrees F. However, actual products made with this type of film may not meet those standards.

Examples of polymers made from starch 
 Polycaprolactone (PCL)
 Polyvinyl alcohol (PVA)
 Polylactic acid (PLA)
The heat, moisture and aeration in an industrial composting plant are required for this type of film to biodegrade, so it will not therefore readily degrade if littered in the environment.

Pros & cons of starch based film/bag

Pros 
 It is "compostable" under industrial conditions.
 Reduced fossil fuel content (depending on loading of filler.)

Cons 
 Is more expensive than its non-biodegradable counterpart 
 Source of starch can be problematic (competition against food use, rainforests being cleared to grow crops for bioplastics)
 Fossil fuels are burned and CO2 produced in the agricultural production process.
 Poorer mechanical strength than additive based example – filling a starch bag with wet leaves and placing it curbside can result in the bottom falling out when a haulier picks it up.
 Often not strong enough for use in high-speed machines
 Degradation in a sealed landfill takes at least 6 months.
 Emits CO2 in aerobic conditions and methane under anaerobic conditions
 Limited Shelf life. Conditions must be respected for stockage.
 If mixed with other plastics for recycling, the recycling process is compromised.

Typical applications 
Carrier bag, refusal sacks, vegetable bags, food films, agricultural films, mailing films. However, these applications are still very limited compared to those of petroleum based plastic films.

Additive based 
Additives can be added to conventional polymers to make them either oxodegradable or more hydrophilic to facilitate microbial attack.

Oxodegradable 

These films are made by incorporating an additive within normal polymers to provide an oxidative and then a biological mechanism to degrade them. This typically takes 6 months to 1 year in the environment with adequate exposure to oxygen   Degradation is a two-stage process; first the plastic is converted by reaction with oxygen (light, heat and/or stress accelerates the process but is not essential) to hydrophilic low molecular-weight materials and then these smaller oxidized molecules are biodegraded, i.e. converted into carbon dioxide, water and biomass by naturally occurring microorganisms. Commercial competitors and their trade associations allege that the process of biodegradation stops at a certain point, leaving fragments, but they have never established why or at what point. In fact Oxo-biodegradation of polymer material has been studied in depth at the Technical Research Institute of Sweden and the Swedish University of Agricultural Sciences. A peer-reviewed report of the work was published in Vol 96 of the journal of Polymer Degradation & Stability (2011) at page 919–928. It shows 91% biodegradation in a soil environment within 24 months, when tested in accordance with ISO 17556.
This is similar to the breakdown of woody plant material where lignin is  broken down and forms a humus component improving the soil quality. 
There is however a lot of controversy about these types of bags. The complete biodegradation is disputed and claimed not to take place. Many countries are now also thinking to ban this type of bags altogether

Enhancing hydrophilicity of the polymer 
These films are inherently biodegradable over a long period of time. Enhancement of the polymer by adding in additives to change the hydrophobic nature of the resin to slightly hydrophilic allows microorganisms to consume the macromolecules of the product, these products often are confused with oxobiodegradable products, but work in a different way. Enhancing of the hydrophilicity of the polymer allows fungus and bacteria to consume the polymer at a faster rate utilizing the carbon inside the polymer chain for energy. These additives attract certain microorganisms found in nature and many tests have been completed on the mixing of synthetic and biobased materials which are inherently biodegradable for enhancing the biodegradability of synthetic polymers that are not as fast to biodegrade.

Pros and cons of additive based film/bag

Pros 
 Much cheaper than starch-based plastics
 Can be made with normal machinery, and can be used in high speed machines, so no need to change suppliers and no loss of jobs
 Materials are well known
 Does not compete against food production
 These films look, act and perform just like their non-degradable counterparts, during their programmed service-life but then break down if discarded.
 They can be recycled with normal plastics.
 They are certified non-toxic, and safe for food-contact
 Some bags degrade at about the same rate as a leaf. In fact, when used as bin liners, bags can start degrading after three or four days of being in the bin.

Cons 
 Degradation depends on access to air
 Not designed to degrade in landfill, but can be safely landfilled. Will degrade if oxygen is present, but will NOT emit methane in landfill
 European or American (EN13432 D6400)Standards on compostable products are not appropriate, as not designed for composting.  They should be tested according to ASTM D6954 or (as from 1 Jan 1010) UAE norm 5009:2009
 They are not suitable for PET or PVC
 Precise rate of degradation/biodegradation cannot be predicted, but will be faster than nature's wastes such as straw or twigs, and much faster than normal plastic
 Like normal plastics they are made from a by-product of oil or natural gas
 If mixed with other plastics for recycling, the recycling process is compromised.

Typical applications 
Trash Bags, Garbage Bags, Compost Bags, Carrier bag, Agricultural Film, Mulch Film, produce bags, - in fact all forms of short-life plastic film packaging

See also 
 Biodegradable plastic
 Bioplastic
 Plastic bag
 Plastic recycling
 Packaging
 Photodegradation

References 

 BBC News: "All Tesco bags 'to be degradable" 10 May 2006 http://news.bbc.co.uk/1/hi/uk/4758419.stm
 BBC News: "Degradable carrier bags launched" 2 September 2002  http://news.bbc.co.uk/1/hi/uk/2229698.stm
 Yam, K. L., "Encyclopedia of Packaging Technology", John Wiley & Sons, 2009, 

Biodegradable materials